Silken Hotels is a hotel chain based in Spain.

Hotels

Al-Andalus Sevilla
Alfonso X Ciudad Real
Amara Plaza San Sebastián
Atlántida Santa Cruz
Ciudad Gijón
Ciudad de Vitoria
Coliseum Santander
Gran Teatro Burgos
Indautxu Bilbao
Juan de Austria Valladolid
Luis de León
Monumental Naranco Oviedo
Ordesa
Palacio Uribarren
Puerta Madrid
Puerta Valencia
Ramblas Barcelona
Reino de Aragón Zaragoza
Rio Santander
Rona Dalba Salamanca
Saaj Las Palmas
St. Gervasi Barcelona
Torre Garden Madrid

References

External links
Hotel Silken website

Hospitality companies of Spain
Hotel chains in Spain